Henri Ackermann (25 July 1922 – 23 January 2014) was a Luxembourgian racing cyclist. He rode in the 1947 and 1948 Tour de France.

References

External links

1922 births
2014 deaths
Luxembourgian male cyclists
Sportspeople from Luxembourg City